This is a list of notable Nigerian cinematographers. Nigeria's film industry is known as Nollywood.

List 

 Yinka Edward
 Niyi Akinmolayan
 Kunle Afolayan
 Adekunle Adejuyigbe
 Toka McBaror
 Anny Robert
 Emamode Edosio
 Clarence Peters
 TG Omori
 Omoni Oboli
 Unlimited L.A
 [Jmix Pro]

Cinematographers